Mityana Hospital, also Mityana General Hospital or Mityana District Hospital is a hospital in the town of Mityana, Mityana District in the Central Region of Uganda.

Location

The coordinates of Mityana Hospital are: 0°23'48.0"N, 32°02'34.0"E
Latitude:0.396667; Longitude:32.042778).

Overview
Mityana Hospital is a public hospital, funded by the Uganda Ministry of Health and general care in the hospital is free. The hospital opened in 1940 and has, until 2013 been in a dilapidated state, with crumbling buildings and antiquated or non-existent equipment. In December 2013, the Government of Uganda, using funds borrowed from the World Bank, began an update and renovation of the institution. Those renovations concluded in 2015.

See also
Mityana
List of hospitals in Uganda

References

External links
 Website of Uganda Ministry of Health 

Hospitals in Uganda
Mityana District
Central Region, Uganda